Başkavak is a village in the Savur District of Mardin Province in Turkey. The village is populated by Arabs and by Kurds of the Bêcirmanî tribe and had a population of 2,014 in 2021.

References 

Villages in Savur District
Kurdish settlements in Mardin Province
Arab settlements in Mardin Province